WAGR-FM (102.5 FM) is an American radio station broadcasting an urban oldies music format. Licensed to Lexington, Mississippi, United States, it serves the Lexington area. Former owner Brad Cothran died in a one-car accident on May 30, 2009, and the license was assigned to Holmes County Broadcasting Company, LLC effective June 29, 2012.

References

External links

AGR-FM